Willy Kalombo Mwenze (born 7 June 1970) is a retired long-distance runner from the Democratic Republic of the Congo who specialized in the marathon. He attended three Olympic Games (1992, 1996, 2000).

He finished fourteenth at the 1997 World Championships and 49th at the 1999 World Championships. He also won a silver medal at the 1996 African Marathon Championships. His personal best time was 2:08:40 hours, achieved in April 1999 in Paris. This is the current national record.

Achievements
All results regarding marathon, unless stated otherwise

References

External links

1970 births
Living people
Democratic Republic of the Congo male marathon runners
Athletes (track and field) at the 1992 Summer Olympics
Athletes (track and field) at the 1996 Summer Olympics
Athletes (track and field) at the 2000 Summer Olympics
Olympic athletes of the Democratic Republic of the Congo
World Athletics Championships athletes for the Democratic Republic of the Congo